The Hunting Party is a 1971 American-British western film directed by Don Medford for Levy-Gardner-Laven and starring Oliver Reed, Gene Hackman, Candice Bergen, Simon Oakland and Ronald Howard.

The film was shot at studios in Madrid, and on location around Spain including the Tabernas Desert in Andalusia. The film's sets were designed by the art director Enrique Alarcón.

Plot
Relations are strained between sexually sadistic cattle baron Brandt Ruger (Gene Hackman) and his wife, Melissa (Candice Bergen) when he leaves for a two-week hunting trip with some of his wealthy friends.

Mistaking her for a schoolteacher, outlaw Frank Calder (Oliver Reed) and his band of rustlers and thieves kidnap Melissa, not for ransom but because Calder wants to be taught how to read a book.

Traveling by luxurious private train, the hunting party engages in debauchery with women, one of whom Ruger sadistically abuses. While the party dines, Ruger presents them with rifles he describes as the “Sharps-Borchardt Model Creedmoor .54 caliber – finest rifle ever made”. He claims it is “accurate up to 800 yards”. Notified that his wife has been taken captive, he then tells his friends they will pick off the kidnapers from a distance with their new, long-range rifles. They will hunt not for animals but for men. 
 
Calder twice must keep Melissa from being raped by his men. But eventually he overpowers and rapes her himself. Melissa tries to shoot and stab Calder and to flee, each time in vain. She goes on a hunger strike, but cannot resist the temptation of a jar of peaches. She begins to enjoy Calder's company.

Using rifles with telescopic sights that can allow shooting a target at 800 yards, Ruger and his men begin to pick off the outlaws one by one. Melissa also stabs one, Hog Warren (L. Q. Jones), after he attempts a second time to rape her. Calder charges within close range and is able to shoot one of Ruger's men. Two others quit the hunting party when they see Ruger's lack of concern over their friend's death.

Calder's men become upset to discover that they have kidnapped such a powerful man's wife, placing them in danger for no good reason. The men revolt and Calder kills one. When his own best friend, Doc (Mitchell Ryan), is gravely wounded, Calder obeys a last request to put Doc out of his misery.

On his death bed, Hog Warren further angers Ruger by telling him Melissa is now Calder's woman. In yet another ambush, Ruger sees for himself that Melissa, rather than trying to escape, leaps onto Calder's horse voluntarily to ride off with him. Ruger's last remaining ally, Matthew (Simon Oakland), implores him to let her go, but the crazed Ruger pays no mind.

The last of Calder's men are gunned down from long range at a water hole. Alone now, Calder and Melissa are driven out into the desert. Weak from heat and thirst, their horse dead, they stumble toward an inevitable fate. Ruger materializes on foot.  He fatally shoots Calder with his rifle.  As Calder is dying Ruger kills Melissa.  Ruger then collapses beside them.  The credits roll over what appears to be a sepia photograph of three bodies in the sand.

Cast
 Oliver Reed as Frank Calder
 Gene Hackman as Brandt Ruger
 Candice Bergen as Melissa Ruger
 Simon Oakland as Matthew Gunn
 L. Q. Jones as "Hog" Warren
 Mitchell Ryan as Doc Harrison
 Ronald Howard as Watt Nelson
 William Watson as Jim Loring
 G.D. Spradlin as Sam Bayard
 Rayford Barnes as Crimp
 Bernard Kay as Buford King
 Richard Adams as "Owney" Clark
 Dean Selmier as Collins
 Sarah Atkinson as Redhead
 Francesca Tu as Chinese Girl

Reception
The reviews for the movie were unrelentingly negative and hostile. Roger Greenspun wrote in The New York Times that it was "a really stupid movie" in which Bergen had "an utterly thankless role" and that the director "hokes up the action to a degree not required by the story and, with a stunning tactlessness, catches scene after scene at its dramatic limit and pushes it over into helpless banality."  Variety wrote "seldom has so much fake blood been splattered for so little".  Tony Mastroianni wrote in The Cleveland Press that "This movie is no picnic. It is a gory western for audiences with strong stomachs.  It also is pretentious. If D. H. Lawrence had written westerns, he might have turned out some of the plot of "The Hunting Party"".  Leonard Maltin gave it his lowest rating, writing "Fine cast is wasted in repellently violent western that adds nothing new".

Soundtrack
The soundtrack was composed by Riz Ortolani. While in Hollywood to score the film he gave interviews criticizing the trend of low budget movies to recut existing music.

References

External links
 
 

1971 films
1970s action films
1970s historical films
1971 independent films
1971 Western (genre) films
1970s action drama films
American historical films
American independent films
British Western (genre) films
Films about kidnapping
British films about revenge
American films about revenge
Films directed by Don Medford
United Artists films
Films shot in Almería
1971 drama films
1970s English-language films
1970s American films
1970s British films